The 2007 NCAA Division I men's lacrosse tournament was held from May 12 through May 28, 2007. This was the 37th annual Division I NCAA Men's Lacrosse Championship tournament. Sixteen NCAA Division I college men's lacrosse teams met after having played their way through a regular season, and for some, a conference tournament.

The first round of the single-elimination tournament was played on May 12 and May 13 at the home field of the top-seeded team. The quarterfinals were held on May 19 and May 20 on two separate neutral fields: the Navy–Marine Corps Memorial Stadium in Annapolis, Maryland, and Princeton Stadium in Princeton, New Jersey. The tournament culminated with the championship weekend, which included the Division II and Division III championships, semifinals and finals held on Memorial Day weekend at M&T Bank Stadium in Baltimore, Maryland. The championship game was played in front of a record crowd of 48,443 fans.

Johns Hopkins won their ninth national title, defeating Duke University in the final 12–11.  Johns Hopkins was led by Paul Rabil and coach Dave Pietramala, and Duke was led by Zack Greer and Matt Danowski. 

Delaware, led by Alex Smith made it to the Final Four for the first time in school history.

Tournament results 

 * = Overtime

 The championship game was played in front of 48,443 fans a tournament record
 100,447 fans attended the tournament a new tournament attendance record

References

External links 
Johns Hopkins Edges Duke to Claim the Championship 
YouTube 2007 NCAA Men's Lacrosse National Championship

NCAA Division I Men's Lacrosse Championship
NCAA Division I Men's Lacrosse Championship
NCAA Division I Men's Lacrosse Championship
NCAA Division I Men's Lacrosse Championship
NCAA Division I Men's Lacrosse Championship